HippoPress is the publisher of the free weekly newspaper Hippo, based in Manchester, New Hampshire. Hippo, which is independently owned by Jody Reese, Jeff Rapsis and Dan Szczesny, started in January 2001. In 2004 it launched a second edition in Nashua and in 2005 it started a third in Concord. In 2007 the editions were combined into one newspaper with a circulation of 42,000. 

In 2009 HippoPress launched Quality of Life Printing and Distribution, a commercial distribution service for other free newspapers and fliers. QOL Distribution circulates publications throughout New Hampshire, Maine and Massachusetts. QOL Printing offers a wide range of commercial printing, from postcards to banners. It also handled direct mail and list services. 

In 2010, Hippo launched Seacoast Hippo, a free weekly distributed from mid June through mid September, to cover arts, entertainment and events in the Seacoast region of southern Maine, New Hampshire and northern Massachusetts. It has a weekly circulation of 20,000 and is distributed along the coast from Kennebunkport to Newburyport. 

The Hippo's parent company, Quality of Life Publication, began some other publications that later folded: a free weekday newspaper in Manchester called the Manchester Daily Express; The Oxx, a semi-weekly circular geared towards males that in the summer of 2007 was turned into a monthly called OxxCycle, covering the state's motorcycling scene, that in 2009 was converted to a semi-yearly glossy magazine before shutting.  In 2009, HippoPress purchased The York Independent, a twice-monthly newspaper in York, Maine, that ceased publication around 2011.

References

External links
The Hippo website
Manchester, New Hampshire
Hillsborough County, New Hampshire
Mass media companies of the United States